Admiral of the Fleet Sir John Leake (4 July 1656 – 21 August 1720) was a Royal Navy officer and politician. As a junior officer he saw action at the Battle of Texel during the Third Anglo-Dutch War. He then distinguished himself when he led the convoy that broke the barricading boom at Culmore Fort thereby lifting the siege of Derry during the Williamite War in Ireland. As a captain he saw action in some of the heaviest fighting (70 of his men were killed) at the Battle of Barfleur and was also involved in a successful attack on the French ships at the Battle of La Hogue during the Nine Years' War.

Leake went on to be Commander-in-Chief, Newfoundland and then, as a flag officer, served as Second-in-Command to Admiral George Rooke at the Capture of Gibraltar and he commanded the vanguard in the Battle of Málaga during the War of the Spanish Succession. He later returned to Gibraltar with a combined English, Dutch and Portuguese force of 35 ships and defeated Baron de Pointis at the Battle of Cabrita Point.

Leake also served under Sir Cloudesley Shovell and the Earl of Peterborough at the siege of Barcelona and was present at the capitulation of the city by French and Spanish forces. A further siege took place between when a Franco-Spanish army led by Philip V of Spain laid siege to Barcelona in an attempt to recapture it. The Franco-Spanish army abandoned the siege when Leake arrived. Leake later captured Sardinia and landed the Earl of Stanhope with forces that took the well-fortified harbour of Port Mahon on Minorca.

Leake served as Member of Parliament for Rochester from 1708 to 1715 and as First Lord of the Admiralty from 1710 to 1712.

Early career
Born the son of Richard Leake, a master gunner, and Elizabeth Leake, Leake joined the Royal Navy in early 1673. He was assigned to the first-rate HMS Royal Prince, flagship of Admiral Sir Edward Spragge, and saw action at the Battle of Texel in August 1673 during the Third Anglo-Dutch War. He left the Royal Navy when the War ended in 1674 and served in merchant vessels but rejoined in 1676 and became master gunner in the second-rate HMS Neptune in 1683. Promoted to commander on 24 September 1688, he was given command of the bomb vessel HMS Firedrake and saw action under Battle of Bantry Bay in May 1689 during the Nine Years' War.

Promoted to captain on 3 May 1689, Leake was given command of the fifth-rate HMS Dartmouth; he distinguished himself when he led the convoy that broke the barricading boom at Culmore Fort thereby lifting the siege of Derry in July 1689 during the Williamite War in Ireland. He transferred to the command of the fourth-rate HMS Oxford in the Mediterranean Fleet in October 1689 and to the command of the third-rate  HMS Eagle in May 1690 and saw action in some of the heaviest fighting (70 of his men were killed) at the Battle of Barfleur in May 1692. Leake also commanded HMS Eagle, by then flagship of Vice-Admiral George Rooke, in a successful attack on the French ships at the Battle of La Hogue later that month. He transferred to the command of the third-rate  HMS Plymouth on convoy protection duties in December 1692 and to the command of the second-rate HMS Ossory in the Mediterranean Fleet in July 1693.

Leake was given command of the third-rate HMS Kent on a mission to transport troops to Ireland in May 1699 and then transferred to the command of the third-rate HMS Berwick in January 1701. He took command of the first-rate HMS Britannia, flagship of the Earl of Pembroke, on an expedition to Cádiz in January 1702, and then transferred to the command of the second-rate HMS Association in June 1702.

Promoted to commodore on 24 June 1702, Leake became Commander-in-Chief, Newfoundland, with his broad pennant in the fourth-rate HMS Exeter. He sailed with eight ships with orders to attack the French fishing harbours and their ships at sea at this early stage of the North American theatre of the War of the Spanish Succession. In this expedition 51 enemy ships were taken or destroyed. While in Newfoundland Leake also reported on the failure of the local people to observe legislation prohibiting trade with New England.

Senior command

Promoted to rear admiral on 9 December 1702, Leake became Commander-in-Chief, Portsmouth in January 1703. Promoted to vice admiral in March 1703, he sailed, with his flag in the second-rate HMS Prince George, in a fleet dispatched under Admiral Sir Cloudesley Shovell to take troops to Lisbon in Spring 1703. Although his ship was caught in the great storm of December 1703, it suffered no serious damage.

Knighted in February 1704, Leake served as Second-in-Command to Admiral George Rooke at the Capture of Gibraltar in August 1704 and he commanded the vanguard in the Battle of Málaga later in the month. In October 1704 Field Marshal Prince George of Hesse-Darmstadt sent a message to Leake at Lisbon requesting his urgent assistance after the appearance of French ships in the Bay of Gibraltar. Leake set sail at once, bringing more supplies for the defenders who were caught in what became known as the twelfth siege of Gibraltar. Leake arrived with twenty ships and, in the subsequent naval engagement, three French ships were captured and two others destroyed. With Gibraltar safe for the moment, Leake left for Lisbon in January 1705 with the sick and wounded members of the garrison aboard his ships. He became Commander-in-Chief, Mediterranean Fleet in later that month and returned to Gibraltar with a combined English, Dutch and Portuguese force of 35 ships and defeated Baron de Pointis at the Battle of Cabrita Point in March 1705. The combined French and Spanish Fleet under Marshal Tessé gave up the siege as hopeless following an order from King Louis XIV of France in April 1705.

Leake served under Sir Cloudesley Shovell and the Earl of Peterborough at the Siege of Barcelona and was present at the capitulation of the city by French and Spanish forces in October 1705. A further siege took place between in April 1706 when a Franco-Spanish army led by Philip V of Spain laid siege to Barcelona in an attempt to recapture it. The Franco-Spanish army abandoned the siege when Leake arrived in May 1706. On the way back, he supported operations to capture Cartagena in May 1706, Alicante in July 1706,  Ibiza in September 1706 and Majorca later that month. Leake was promoted to full admiral, appointed Commander in Chief of the Mediterranean Fleet and given authority to fly the flag of an Admiral of the Fleet on 8 January 1708.

Leake was appointed a member of the council of the Lord High Admiral (an office vested at that time in Prince George of Denmark) in June 1708 and elected Member of Parliament for Member of Parliament for Harwich in May 1708 and Member of Parliament for Rochester in July 1708. He could not represent both seats and chose to represent the latter.

Meanwhile, back in the Mediterranean, Leake captured Sardinia in August 1708 and landed the Earl of Stanhope with forces that took the well-fortified harbour of Port Mahon on Minorca in September 1708. He was re-appointed Commander-in-Chief of the Navy for an expedition to the Baltic Sea in December 1708 and, after being appointed Rear-Admiral of Great Britain on 24 May 1709, went on to join the Board of Admiralty led by the Earl of Orford, as Senior Naval Lord, in November 1709. In Parliament he supported the prosecution of Henry Sacheverell in Spring 1710. Later that year he donated a new altarpiece, communion-table, rails and pavement for the chancel at St Mary's Church in Beddington where he owned a country house.

Leake became First Lord of the Admiralty in the Harley Ministry in November 1710, but declined to take a political position in that role, and was re-appointed Commander-in-Chief of the Navy for expeditions in January 1711 (for trade protection in the Channel) and in April 1712 (for an attack on Dunkirk). He stood down as First Lord of the Admiralty in September 1712 and reverted to his former role as First Naval Lord on the Admiralty Board. He was re-appointed Commander-in-Chief of the Navy for yet another expedition in March 1713 before resigning from the Admiralty Board in October 1714. Knowing that he would be perceived as a Tory, following his active involvement in the Harley Ministry, he stood down from Parliament immediately prior to the general election in 1715.

Leake died at his town house in Greenwich on 21 August 1720 and was buried at St Dunstan's, Stepney. John Campbell described him as a "virtuous, humane and gallant man, and one of the greatest admirals of his time."

Family
In around 1681 Leake married Christiane Hill, daughter of Captain Richard Hill; they had one son.

References

Sources

Further reading

External links 

 John Leake Three decks

|-

|-

|-

|-

1656 births
1720 deaths
Royal Navy admirals of the fleet
Lords of the Admiralty
First Sea Lords and Chiefs of the Naval Staff
British naval commanders in the War of the Spanish Succession
Members of the Parliament of Great Britain for English constituencies
People from Rotherhithe
British MPs 1708–1710
British MPs 1710–1713
British MPs 1713–1715
Williamite military personnel of the Williamite War in Ireland